Sangrampur may refer to the following places:

India
Sangrampur, Maharashtra
 Sangrampur, Unnao, Uttar Pradesh
Sangrampur, Magrahat, South 24 Parganas district, West Bengal
Sangrampur railway station
Sangrampur, Diamond Harbour, South 24 Parganas, West Bengal

Nepal
Sangrampur, Sarlahi
Sangrampur, Rautahat

See also